Qimmit a Clash of Two Truths or Qimmit, un choc deux vérités (French title) is a 2010 Canadian documentary film directed by Joelie Sanguya and Ole Gjerstad about the Inuit and events in the years around 1960 that affected their semi-nomadic lifestyle and in particular the killing of their sled dogs (Qimmit). Some believe this was done deliberately by the government to force them off their land. The Qikiqtani Truth Commission looked into the affair and reported that there was no conspiracy. Different viewpoints from the Inuit and the Royal Canadian Mounted Police (RCMP) are heard in the film. The film is co-produced by Piksuk Media and the National Film Board of Canada.

See also
Okpik's Dream, a related 2015 Canadian documentary film

References

External links 
Qikiqtani Truth Commission Thematic Reports and Special Studies 1950–1975 Analysis of the RCMP Sled Dog Report
Qikiqtani Truth Commission Thematic Reports and Special Studies 1950–1975 Qimmiliriniq:Inuit Sled Dogs in Qikiqtaaluk

Royal Canadian Mounted Police
National Film Board of Canada documentaries
2010 films
2010 documentary films
Documentary films about dogs
Dog sledding
Documentary films about the Arctic
Documentary films about Indigenous rights in Canada
Documentary films about Inuit in Canada
Documentary films about law enforcement in Canada
2010s Canadian films